Craig Michael Kimbrel (born May 28, 1988) is an American professional baseball pitcher for the Philadelphia Phillies of Major League Baseball (MLB). He has previously played in MLB for the San Diego Padres, Boston Red Sox, Atlanta Braves, Chicago Cubs, Chicago White Sox and Los Angeles Dodgers. He is an eight-time All-Star, two-time Reliever of the Year, and a 2018 World Series champion. He is known for his triple-digit fastball, as well as his unique pre-pitch stare.

As a rookie with the Braves in 2011, Kimbrel was named their closer, and set an MLB record for saves by a rookie, with 46. He was awarded the National League's (NL) 2011 Rookie of the Year Award. He led the NL in saves for four consecutive seasons (2011– 2014). He recorded his 200th save in June 2015 with the Padres, and his 300th save in May 2018 with the Red Sox, making him the youngest pitcher in MLB history to reach the milestone.

Early life
Craig is the son of Mike and Sandy Kimbrel. He attended Lee High School in Huntsville, Alabama, where he played baseball and was a quarterback for the football team. In baseball, Kimbrel was a teammate of Buddy Boshers.

Kimbrel attended Wallace State Community College. While at Wallace State in 2007, Kimbrel had an 8–0 win–loss record with a 1.99 earned run average (ERA) as a freshman in 2007, serving as the team's closer and a spot starter. In 2008, he was 9–3 with a 2.88 ERA, striking out 123 hitters in 81 innings pitched, mainly as a reliever.

Professional career
The Atlanta Braves selected Kimbrel in the 33rd round of the 2007 MLB draft, but he elected to remain at Wallace State in order to improve his draft position. He was then taken by the Braves in the third round, with the 96th overall selection, of the 2008 MLB draft.

Atlanta Braves (2010–2014)

2010
Kimbrel got his first call-up from the Gwinnett Braves on May 15, 2010, to replace the injured Jair Jurrjens on the roster. He was called up for the second time in his career on June 4, 2010, to replace Takashi Saito, who was placed on the 15-day DL. He earned his first major league save on September 19, 2010, against the New York Mets. Kimbrel's record for the 2010 season was 4–0, with one save and a 0.44 ERA in  innings. He recorded 40 strikeouts and 16 walks. In the 2010 2010 NLDS, he was the losing pitcher in Game 3 against the eventual World Series Champion San Francisco Giants.

2011
Kimbrel made the roster to start the 2011 season as the team's primary closer. He was successful in his first four save opportunities before blowing his first career save on April 21, 2011. On June 3, 2011, in a game versus the New York Mets, Kimbrel passed the record for most saves by a National League rookie before the All-Star break. He is the fastest Braves pitcher to reach 100 career strikeouts, doing so in  career innings. His new record surpassed the previous record set by John Rocker in the 1998–1999 season, where it took Rocker 70 career innings to reach the 100 career strikeout mark. On July 5, his 26th save matched Jonathan Papelbon's record for most saves by a rookie before the All-Star break. On July 7, Kimbrel's 27th save of the year against the Colorado Rockies broke Papelbon's record.

Kimbrel was selected to the 2011 All Star Game during his first full season in the majors. San Francisco Giants manager Bruce Bochy chose Kimbrel as a replacement for Giants pitcher Matt Cain.

On July 22, 2011, in a game versus the Cincinnati Reds, Kimbrel broke the Braves rookie record for saves in a season (31).

On August 9, 2011, in a game versus the Florida Marlins, Kimbrel tied the National League rookie record for saves in a season (36 by Todd Worrell of the St. Louis Cardinals in 1986). He broke that record on August 17 in a game versus the San Francisco Giants. On August 21, 2011, Kimbrel recorded his 100th strike out which coincided with his 39th save of the season and a string of  innings without yielding a run. On August 23, 2011, Kimbrel recorded his 40th save, tying the rookie save record of Neftalí Feliz. He subsequently broke this record with his 41st save on August 31 with two strikeouts in a game against the Washington Nationals. At the time, he led the majors in saves and had not given up a run in his last 34 innings. The following night, Kimbrel surpassed Cliff Lee's mark of 34 scoreless innings with  scoreless innings for the longest scoreless streak in the majors in 2011. He was named the NL Rookie of the Month and Delivery Man of the Month for August 2011. His scoreless inning streak came to an end after  innings, on September 9, 2011.

The Braves' season ended when Kimbrel blew a save against the Philadelphia Phillies in the last game of the season. The loss knocked Atlanta out of playoff contention, completing a historic late-season collapse that squandered an early September lead of  games in the National League Wild Card race. Kimbrel's mediocre September (4.76 ERA) led to charges that manager Fredi González had overworked him over the course of the season.

Kimbrel ended the season tied for the National League lead with 46 saves—surpassing the previous rookie record of 40, set by Feliz in 2010—and led major league relievers with 127 strikeouts in 77 innings.

On November 14, the Baseball Writers' Association of America announced the results of their 2011 National League Rookie of the Year vote; Craig Kimbrel received all 32 first-place ballots—the first unanimous selection since 2001 winner Albert Pujols—for 160 points. Freddie Freeman finished second in the voting with 21 second-place votes and seven third-place votes, for a total of 70 points—making the pair the first teammates to take the top two spots since 1989, when the Chicago Cubs' Jerome Walton and Dwight Smith came in first and second in the balloting. The only other time two Braves finished in the top five, the organization was still located in Milwaukee—Gene Conley was voted third-best rookie of the 1954 season; Hank Aaron came in fourth. He was also named the Players Choice Awards NL Outstanding Rookie by the Major League Baseball Players Association.

2012
Kimbrel again made the All-Star team in 2012. He struck out the two batters he faced. He won the Delivery Man of the Month Award for September 2012. On September 26, he struck out four batters in the ninth inning.

Kimbrel was thoroughly dominant throughout the 2012 season. He led the National League with 42 saves (in 45 opportunities) and Win Probability Added among pitchers. He struck out 116 batters in  innings, producing a K/9 rate of 16.7. In so doing, he also became the first pitcher in history to strike out at least half the batters he faced during a season. He also went to an 0–2 count on 56% of the batters he faced. Kimbrel allowed only 3.9 hits and 2.0 walks per 9 innings he pitched, giving him a WHIP of 0.65 and a batting average against of .126. He finished with an ERA of 1.01. He won the NL Rolaids Relief Man Award. Kimbrel finished fifth in the 2012 National League Cy Young Award voting, and eighth in the 2012 National League MVP voting.

2013

Kimbrel began the 2013 season with three blown saves during his first nine save opportunities, tying his personal record for blown saves during the entire 2012 season. Nonetheless, on May 9, 2013, in a game against the San Francisco Giants, Kimbrel earned his 100th save making him the second youngest player in MLB history to reach that mark. With a save against the Cardinals on July 27, 2013, he became only the second Atlanta pitcher after John Smoltz to have three 30-save seasons. Kimbrel surpassed John Smoltz's Braves record of 27 consecutive saves on August 17, 2013.

On September 27, Kimbrel recorded his 50th save of the season in a game against the Philadelphia Phillies. In doing so, he became the 11th pitcher in Major League history to have a 50-save season. He won the Delivery Man of the Year Award (across all of MLB) and also was voted the "GIBBY Awards" Closer of the Year – by the fans, media, team front-office personnel, former players, and SABR.

2014
On February 16, 2014, Kimbrel agreed to a four-year, $42 million extension with the Braves that ran through 2017, with an option for 2018. On April 2, Kimbrel tied Gene Garber's 141 saves with the Braves, good for second in franchise history. Two days later, April 4, Kimbrel recorded his 142nd career save, to move into sole possession of second place. On April 25, 2014, Kimbrel became the fastest pitcher ever to reach 400 strikeouts—reaching the mark in 236 innings' worth of work. On June 6, 2014, Kimbrel recorded his 155th save in a game against the Arizona Diamondbacks, surpassing John Smoltz as the new franchise leader in saves. On August 29, 2014, Kimbrel recorded his 40th save of the season. He became the third pitcher to reach that single-season milestone in four straight seasons. Kimbrel finished the season with a 1.61 ERA and 95 strikeouts in  innings. He led the National League with 47 saves, becoming the first pitcher to lead the NL in saves for four consecutive seasons since Bruce Sutter (1979–82).

San Diego Padres (2015) 

On April 5, 2015, Kimbrel was traded to the San Diego Padres along with outfielder Melvin Upton, Jr., in exchange for Carlos Quentin, Cameron Maybin, prospects Matt Wisler, Jordan Paroubeck, and the 41st overall pick in the 2015 MLB draft.

On June 8, Kimbrel recorded his 200th career save against his former team, the Braves. He became the fastest pitcher ever to reach that milestone, taking only 318 games to do so.

In his one season with the Padres, Kimbrel made 61 appearances, finishing 53 games while recording 39 saves; he struck out 87 while walking 22 in  innings pitched with a 2.58 ERA.

Boston Red Sox (2016–2018)

On November 13, 2015, the Padres traded Kimbrel to the Boston Red Sox in exchange for Manuel Margot, Javy Guerra, Carlos Asuaje, and Logan Allen.

2016
On July 8, 2016, Kimbrel injured his knee while taking warmups. The next day, an MRI revealed that there was a tear in the medial meniscus of the left knee. The injury required surgery, and three to six weeks to recover. He returned to the bullpen at the start of August.

For the 2016 Red Sox, Kimbrel made 57 regular season appearances, finishing 47 games while recording 31 saves. In 53 innings pitched, he had a 3.40 ERA while striking out 83 and walking 30.

In the 2016 American League Division Series, Kimbrel made two appearances; he retired all four batters he faced, three by strikeout, as the Red Sox were swept by the Cleveland Indians.

2017
On May 11, 2017, against the Milwaukee Brewers at Miller Park, Kimbrel struck out the side in the ninth inning on nine consecutive pitches, joining Pedro Martínez and Clay Buchholz as the only pitchers in franchise history to accomplish this feat, commonly referred to as an immaculate inning. Two weeks later, Kimbrel recorded a second four-strikeout inning while facing the Texas Rangers. Kimbrel was subsequently named AL Reliever of the Month for May.

For the 2017 Red Sox, Kimbrel made 67 regular season appearances, finishing 51 games while recording 35 saves. In 69 innings pitched, he had a 1.43 ERA while striking out 126 and walking 14. Of all MLB pitchers, he held right-handed batters to the lowest batting average, .108 (in 30 or more innings).

In the 2017 American League Division Series, Kimbrel made two one-inning appearances; he faced a total of 12 batters, giving up four hits, one walk, and one run while recording two strikeouts, as the Red Sox lost to the eventual World Series champions, the Houston Astros.

2018
On May 5, 2018, facing the Texas Rangers, Kimbrel recorded his 300th career save. He achieved this milestone in fewer games (494), fewer save opportunities (330), and at a younger age (29) than any other pitcher. On July 8, Kimbrel recorded his 27th save of the season, and was named to the 2018 MLB All-Star Game. For the 2018 regular season, Kimbrel recorded 42 saves in 63 appearances, pitching to a 2.74 ERA with 96 strikeouts in  innings.

In the postseason, Kimbrel recorded six saves while allowing seven earned runs in  innings, as the Red Sox went on to win the World Series over the Los Angeles Dodgers in five games. On November 12, Kimbrel declined Boston's one-year, $17.9 million qualifying offer, thus becoming a free agent.

Kimbrel did not sign with any teams during the off-season, remaining a free agent into the 2019 season.

Chicago Cubs (2019–2021)
On June 7, 2019, Kimbrel signed with the Chicago Cubs on a three-year contract, reportedly worth $43 million. On June 27, he was added to the Cubs' major league roster from the Triple-A Iowa Cubs, and recorded his first save of the season, against Atlanta. On August 5, 2019, he was placed on IL for a knee inflammation. On August 18, 2019, he was reactivated from the IL to help the Cubs beleaguered bullpen. He finished the year 0–4 with 13 saves and a 6.53 ERA in 23 games.

In the pandemic-shortened 2020 season, Kimbrel went 0–1 with a 5.28 ERA and recorded 28 strikeouts and 12 walks in  innings.

On May 26, 2021, Kimbrel advanced to 11th on the all time saves list after the Cubs beat the Pirates 4–1 at Pittsburgh. On June 24, 2021, Kimbrel pitched a combined no-hitter against the Los Angeles Dodgers along with Zach Davies, Ryan Tepera, and Andrew Chafin.

Chicago White Sox (2021)
On July 30, 2021, the Cubs traded Kimbrel to the Chicago White Sox in exchange for Nick Madrigal and Codi Heuer. Out of the closer role, Kimbrel had a 5.09 ERA in 24 regular season games and a 9.00 ERA in three playoff games for the White Sox. On November 22, the White Sox exercised his $16 million option for the 2022 season.

Los Angeles Dodgers (2022)
On April 1, 2022, the White Sox traded Kimbrel to the Los Angeles Dodgers in exchange for A. J. Pollock. He pitched in 63 games for the Dodgers and finished with a 6–7 record, 3.75 ERA and 22 saves. However, by the end of the season he had been removed from the closer role.

Philadelphia Phillies (2023–present)
On January 4, 2023, Kimbrel signed a one-year, $10 million contract with the Philadelphia Phillies.

International career
Kimbrel was named the closer for Team USA in the 2013 World Baseball Classic. Despite not surrendering one lead off double all year with the Braves in 2012, Kimbrel gave one up to Nelson Cruz of the Dominican Republic in their round two matchup. Kimbrel would go on to give up two runs in the game, and be the losing pitcher in Team USA's 3–1 loss to the eventual champions.

Pitching style
Kimbrel uses a combination of a four-seam fastball and a power curveball to get outs. His curve, thrown with a "spike" grip, stays in the mid-to-upper 80s. The whiff rate of his four-seamer is 33%, and the curve is at 52%. This combination contributes to a career strikeouts per nine innings rate of 14.7. He is also tied for third among all pitchers from 2002–2012 in the highest percentage of pitches that resulted in swinging strikes.

Kimbrel's four-seam fastball was the 12th-fastest among Major League relievers in the 2011 season. In addition, he threw the hardest curveball, averaging . His fastball had the fifth-highest whiff rate among relief pitchers (32%), and he also had the highest whiff rate of any reliever's curveball, at better than 55%. His pre-pitch stance has also been widely noted and has been dubbed "Kimbreling" or "Spider Arms".

Personal life
Kimbrel has two brothers, Alan and Matt. Matt Kimbrel played baseball in the Braves minor league system for three seasons before being released.

Kimbrel married former Wallace State cheerleader Ashley Holt in 2012. The couple's daughter was born on November 3, 2017. She was born with heart defects and has undergone two surgeries.

Kimbrel is a born again Christian.

See also

 Atlanta Braves award winners and league leaders
 List of Boston Red Sox award winners
 List of Chicago Cubs no-hitters
 List of Major League Baseball career games finished leaders
 List of Major League Baseball no-hitters
 List of Major League Baseball single-inning strikeout leaders
 List of people from Huntsville, Alabama

Notes

References

External links

1988 births
Living people
American League All-Stars
Atlanta Braves players
Baseball players from Alabama
Boston Red Sox players
Chicago Cubs players
Chicago White Sox players
Danville Braves players
Gwinnett Braves players
Iowa Cubs players
Los Angeles Dodgers players
Major League Baseball pitchers
Major League Baseball Rookie of the Year Award winners
Mississippi Braves players
Myrtle Beach Pelicans players
National League All-Stars
National League saves champions
Peoria Saguaros players
Rome Braves players
San Diego Padres players
Sportspeople from Huntsville, Alabama
Wallace State Lions baseball players
World Baseball Classic players of the United States
2013 World Baseball Classic players